Omukama: often translated as "king of kings", (O)Mukama means in Bantu (Banyoro-, Batoro- and other languages) something like "superior milkman/milkbringer". The title "Omukama" is used in the region of Uganda and neighbouring countries, especially in the kingdoms of "Bunyoro" and "Toro". After reestablishing the Ugandan kingdoms in the 1990s the Omukama are nowadays accepted "kings" with a merely cultural function.

See also
 Omukama of Bunyoro
 Omukama of Toro

Society of Uganda
Royal titles